Fahad Ahmad is an Indian student leader and social activist who served as the General Secretary of the Tata Institute of Social Science Student's Union. In July 2022, he joined Samajwadi Party in the presence of Abu Azmi and Rais Shaikh. He became President of the Samajwadi Party of Maharashtra and Mumbai.

Early life and education
Fahad Ahmad was born in Baheri.

Activism
During his tenure as the general secretary of the TISS Student Union in 2017–2018, Ahmad led a protest against the rolling back of the fee waiver for Scheduled Castes, Scheduled Tribes, and other backward class students, accompanied by over 1000 students. Prakash Ambedkar also supported students in this matter.

Ahmad participated in Anti-CAA protests in Mumbai and attended several rallies across India. He was a part of the Wankhede silent protest during India vs. Australia ODI series. He stated against Citizenship Amendment Act, calling it unconstitutional. In December 2019, he led the August Kranti Maidan protest.

Ahmad, with more than 100 volunteers, distributed food kits across eight centers in Mumbai slums. Every Saturday evening, they provided food packets to 210 families. The group also distributed around 100 sanitizers worth 10,000₹(120$) to on-duty police personnel which they highly promoted in their campaigns.

Controversies
Tata Institute of Social Sciences denied students for clearance after Ahmad refused to accept an MPhil degree from the chairperson of the university S. Ramadorai during the convocation ceremony.

Tata Institute of Social Sciences denied Ahmad registration into the Ph.D. program after he refused to receive his M.Phil. Degree. Tata Institute then gave an order that described Ahmad's action as an insult to the university.

Personal life
On 16 February 2023, Ahmad married Bollywood actress Swara Bhasker. The marriage was criticised by Islamic scholar Yasir Nadeem al Wajidi who called it "legal but not accepted in Islam". This created a Twitter battle between the scholar and RJ Sayema.

References

External links
 

Indian activists
Living people
Student politics in India
Year of birth missing (living people)